B2Krazy was a dance pop group from Toronto, Ontario, Canada. The group consist of two young instrumentalists, Zael Miransky, CFP (mcowealth.com) and Brett Ryan Kruger, rapper Revren, lead singer Geneviève Marchesseau and 'spiritual advisor' Yahoo. The act was signed to the BMG Records subsidiary Iron Music.

The band was the creation of Wayne Fromm, and was based on the toy known as Crazy Bones. Fromm and his partner, Eric Segal, were marketing the toy through their company All 4 Fun Toy Products Ltd. The B2Krazy video for their song  "Something to Say" contains animated images of Crazy Bones characters. 

In 2000, the band released their album B2Krazy, which produced two top-20 hits: "Dream About You" and "Something To Say". "Something To Say" was featured in a 2001 episode of Degrassi: The Next Generation. Shortly after the album's release, the group broke up. Brett Ryan Kruger went on to play with, and write for, several artists.  Kruger and Epstein are now the songwriting/production team The Maven Boys. The other members left the music world. After the album's release, Fromm sold his shares in the project to Segal and went on to invent the Selfie stick.

Discography
"B2K Crazy" (1999, promotional single), Iron Music
"Give It Up" (2000, promotional single), Iron Music
B2Krazy (2000), Iron Music

References

Music video
"Dream About You" music video from YouTube

Canadian dance music groups
Canadian pop music groups
Musical groups from Toronto
Musical groups established in 1999
Musical groups disestablished in 2001
1999 establishments in Ontario
2001 disestablishments in Ontario